Munhyeon Station is a station on the Busan Metro Line 2 in Munhyeon-dong, Nam District, Busan, South Korea.

External links

  Cyber station information from Busan Transportation Corporation

Busan Metro stations
Nam District, Busan
Railway stations opened in 2001